Vespersaurus (meaning "western lizard") is a genus of noasaurid theropod dinosaur from the Early Cretaceous Rio Paraná Formation in the Paraná Basin, Brazil. The type and only species is V. paranaensis, which would have lived in the giant prehistoric Botucatu Desert.

Etymology 

The generic name is derived from the Latin "vesper," meaning "evening/west," in reference to the town Cruzeiro do Oeste ("Western Cross") near which the fossils were found, and the Greek "sauros," meaning "lizard." The specific name refers to the Paraná state.

Discovery and naming 

After the discovery of numerous skeletons of the pterosaurs Caiuajara and Keresdrakon at the Cemitério dos Pterossauros site near Cruzeiro do Oeste, the remains of small theropods were uncovered between 2011 and 2015. One of these was named and described in 2019 as Vespersaurus. The holotype, MPCO.V 0065d, was recovered from the Late Cretaceous period, found on dark red sandstones in the Rio Paraná Formation in the Paraná Basin, Brazil. Footprints belonging to Vespersaurus or a similar one-toed theropod were discovered near Cruzeiro do Oeste as early as the 1970s.

Description 

The taxon is notable for its distinct, functionally monodactyl foot anatomy, where the singularly large third digit would have borne most of the weight while walking. This makes it comparable in size to Noasaurus and Masiakasaurus.

Ichnology 
Footprints pertaining to a functionally monodactyl dinosaur found near Cianorte were attributed to Vespersaurus or to a close relative. Those footprints were found in association with the ichnospecies Brasilichnium elusivum. It had been suggested that Vespersaurus footprints and/or Brasilichnium elusivum could have originated myths regarding footsteps of a saint near Cianorte.

See also
 Timeline of ceratosaur research

References 

Abelisaurs
Late Cretaceous dinosaurs of South America
Cretaceous Brazil
Fossils of Brazil
Fossil taxa described in 2019
Paraná Basin